Robert Houston may refer to:
 Robert Houston (actor) (born 1955), American actor and filmmaker from California
 Robert Houston (New Zealand politician) (1842–1912), Liberal Party Member of Parliament in New Zealand
 Robert Houston (photographer) (born 1935), American photographer of the civil rights movement
 Robert G. Houston (1867–1946), American lawyer, publisher and politician
 Robert S. Houston (1820–1902), Wisconsin legislator
 Sir Robert Houston, 1st Baronet (1853–1926), British Conservative Party politician and shipowner
 Robert Louis Houston (1780–1862), British military officer in the service of the East India Company
 Robert Houston II (born 1980), professionally known as Black Pegasus, American rapper

See also
 Bobby Houston (disambiguation)